Spinetail can refer to birds of several genera:

 Family Apodidae (swifts):
 Mearnsia
 Zoonavena
 Telacanthura
 Rhaphidura
 Neafrapus
 Family Furnariidae (ovenbirds):
 Schoeniophylax
 Synallaxis
 Siptornopsis
 Gyalophylax
 Hellmayrea
 Cranioleuca
 Certhiaxis